{{Infobox album
| name       = Sin Mirar Atrás
| type       = Studio album
| artist     = David Bisbal
| cover      = Sin-mirar-atras-david-bisbal.jpg
| border     = yes
| alt        =
| released   = 
| recorded   = 2008-2009(Madrid, Miami, Los Angeles, Mexico, Bratislava, London, Stockholm, São Paulo)
| venue      =
| studio     =
| genre      = Latin pop · pop rock
| length     = 46:02
| label      = Vale Music · Universal Music Spain · Universal Music Latino
| producer   = 
 Sebastián Krys
 José Luis de la Peña
 Armando Ávila
 Antonio Rayo
 Jacobo Calderón
  Rafael Vergara
 Dimitri Stassos
| prev_title = Premonición Live
| prev_year  = 2007
| next_title = Tú y Yo
| next_year  = 2014
| misc       = 
  
}}

Sin Mirar Atrás (Without Looking Back) is the fourth studio album recorded by Spanish singer David Bisbal. It was released on October 20, 2009, by Universal Music Spain. It was re-released on July 27, 2010, as Sin Mirar Atrás (24 Horas + Edition).

Recording and background
Sin Mirar Atrás  was recorded in studios in Madrid, Miami, Los Angeles, Mexico, Bratislava, London, Stockholm and São Paulo. The album was produced by the Latin Grammy Award-winner Sebastián Krys, José Luis de la Peña, Armando Ávila, Antonio Rayo, Jacobo Calderón, Rafael Vergara and Dimitri Stassos, as well as Bisbal himself, who is credited as co-writer on six songs. It includes collaborations from the English singer-songwriter Pixie Lott and the Mexican singer-songwriter Espinoza Paz.

The album was released in three versions: standard (which has only 11 tracks), deluxe (released the same day with three bonus tracks including the duet with Lott) and the 24 horas + edition (which has the tracks from the standard edition and three versions of "24 Horas" featuring Paz).

Track listing

Charts

Chart positions

Certifications

Release history

References

External links 
 

2009 albums
David Bisbal albums
Spanish-language albums
Universal Music Spain albums
Universal Music Latino albums
Albums produced by Sebastian Krys